A ova bank, or cryobank or egg cell bank, is a facility that collects and stores human ova, mainly from ova donors, primarily for the purpose of achieving pregnancies of either the donor, at a later time (i.e. to overcome issues of infertility), or through third party reproduction, notably by artificial insemination. Ova donated in this way are known as donor ova.

General
There are currently very few ova banks in existence.

Generally, the main purpose of storing ova, at present, is to overcome infertility which may arise at a later age, or due to a disease. The ova are generally collected between 31 and 35 years of age.

The procedure of collecting ova may or may not include ovarian hyperstimulation.

It can be expected however that ova collection will become more important in the future, i.e. for third party reproduction, and/or for producing stem cells, i.e. from unfertilized eggs (oocytes).

See also
 Sperm bank
 Gene bank
 Artificial insemination
 Genetic counseling
 Genetic testing
 New eugenics
 Safe upper age limit for women donating ova
 Eugenics
 Infertility
 Surrogacy
 Commercial surrogacy
 Assisted reproduction
 Designer babies

References

Fertility medicine
Cryobiology
Biorepositories